Maldonado is the capital of Maldonado Department of Uruguay. As of the census of 2021, it is the ninth most populated city of the country.

Maldonado is also the name of the municipality to which the city belongs. It includes the following zones: Maldonado, Punta Ballena, Portezuelo, Barrio Hipódromo, Canteras de Marelli, Los Ceibos, Abra de Perdomo, Laguna del Diario, El Placer, Cantegril, Maldonado Nuevo, Cerro Pelado, San Francisco, Los Pelotas,San Fernando, Estación, Leonel, Perlita, Dominitez, El Molino, and Biarritz.

History
The origin of Maldonado's name dates back to January 1530, when Sebastian Cabot, an Italian explorer, departed for Castilla and left his Lieutenant, Francisco Maldonado, in what is now the bay of Maldonado. After the Treaty of Madrid, when they started to divide Spanish and Portuguese properties in that region of America, the military governor of Montevideo, José Joaquín de Viana, suggested to the King that they should establish two populations, one in Maldonado and the other in Minas. In August 1755, still waiting for a response from the King, Viana decided to leave with some families and head towards Portezuelo. It was there that Maldonado was founded. Viana later left the settlement, leaving the inhabitants with animals and sufficient supplies to live. The population was able to survive and grow due to the profits from growing crops and raising livestock. When he returned 20 months later, he brought 7 indigenous families with him and incorporated them into the small village to help the population grow. He also moved the settlement to their current site.

The buildings that are built around the town square in Maldonado today, including the cathedral, are reminiscent of traditional Spanish style, giving evidence that the Spanish royalty were involved in the growth and development of Maldonado. In May 1783, the population had grown and the villagers gave Don Luis Estremera the power to oversee the creation of a city council, thus legally establishing the city 25 years after Viana had founded it. After years of attempts, on March 14, 1787, an election was held and approved 8 days later, and the City Council of Maldonado was elected and the Town of Maldonado became the City of San Fernando De Maldonado in honor of Ferdinand VI of Spain. With a City Council established, the people of Maldonado could defend their rights as citizens.

Geography
It is located on Route 39 and shares borders with Punta del Este to the south, Pinares – Las Delicias to the south and to the east and suburb La Sonrisa to the north. Together they all form a unified metropolitan area.

East of the city flows the stream Arroyo Maldonado.

Climate

Maldonado has an oceanic climate (Köppen: Cfb) with mild winters and without snow. The summers are warm (recently hot occasionally), similar to southeastern Australia. By be in the way of the Malvinas/Falkland current and in the bottleneck of the continent it generates a rare temperate climate typically of the ocean in an east coast. But the city is close to a humid subtropical climate (Cfa), consolidating in the coming decades.

Population
In 2011 the city of Maldonado had a population of 62,590. According to the Intendencia Departamnetal de Maldonado, the municipality of Maldonado has a population of 105,000.

 
Source: Instituto Nacional de Estadística de Uruguay

Main sights
Remarkable sights in Maldonado include:

San Fernando de Maldonado Cathedral, a neoclassic cathedral begun in 1801 and completed in 1895
Cuartel de Dragones (The Dragoons' Barracks), a Spanish garrison begun in 1771 and completed in 1797
Torre del Vigia (meaning "tower of vigilance" or, more simply, "watchtower"), built in 1800 under the direction of Rafael Pérez del Puerto; its function was to inform the authorities of the entrance in Buenos Aires of the approach of any ship to the Río de la Plata
El Puente de la Barra, a stressed ribbon bridge, where the roadbed swoops up, down, and back up and down once more, demonstrating an exceptional economy of material
Casapueblo hotel

Places of worship
 Cathedral of St. Ferdinand (Roman Catholic)
 Church of Our Lady of the Remedies (Roman Catholic)
 Church of Our Lady of the Thirty-Three (Roman Catholic)

Notable residents
 Alberto Abdala (1920–1986), Vice President of Uruguay from 1967 to 1972
 Johnny Aquino (1978- ), Association Football midfielder for Sarmiento de Junín
 Maite Cáceres (2003- ), racing driver
 Martín Campaña (1989- ), goalkeeper for Cerro Largo FC
 Fernando Clavijo (1956- ), retired soccer player for the Colorado Rapids

See also
 Maldonado Department Main Urban Centres

References

External links 

 Many pictures of Maldonado, Punta del Este, Punta Ballena, Casapueblo, José Ignacio, Piriápolis, La Barra, Sierra De Las Animas
 The Maldonado Portal
Hotels in Punta del Este, Maldonado
INE map of Maldonado, Villa Delia, La Sonrisa, Cerro Pelado, Los Aromos and Pinares-Las Delicias
 Map of the city of Maldonado by the Intendencia

 
Populated places in the Maldonado Department
Populated places established in 1755